The Ulysses S. Grant Home in Galena, Illinois is the former home of Ulysses S. Grant, the Civil War general and later 18th President of the United States. The home was designed by William Dennison and constructed in 1859 - 1860.  The home was given to Grant by residents of Galena in 1865 as thanks for his war service, and has been maintained as a memorial to Grant since 1904.

History

Architecture
The house was designed in the Italianate style by William Dennison.  Typical of buildings done in that style, the home featured well defined rectangular shapes, a roof with a low pitch, balustraded balconies extending out over covered porches, and projecting eaves.

Historic recognition
Located on  Bouthillier Street, the U.S. Grant Home State Historic Site is owned by the state of Illinois and managed by the Illinois Historic Preservation Agency as a historic house museum with rooms furnished to represent a mid-1860s appearance. Many of the furnishings belonged to the Grant family. Information is given about Grant's activities during the Civil War up through his presidency.  An adjacent building houses exhibits about Grant and the history of the home.

The Grant Home was designated a National Historic Landmark on December 19, 1960, and added to the National Register of Historic Places on October 15, 1966, upon that program's inception. The Grant House also lies within the Galena Historic District, designated in 1969. The district has more than 1,000 contributing properties.

Gallery

See also
Elihu Benjamin Washburne House
Ulysses S. Grant National Historic Site, earlier home near St. Louis
General Grant National Memorial (Grant's tomb)
Grant Cottage State Historic Site, Mt. McGregor, New York
Grant Boyhood Home, Georgetown, Ohio
Grant Birthplace, Point Pleasant, Ohio
List of residences of presidents of the United States

References

External links

U.S. Grant Home
Property Information Report: Ulysses S. Grant House, Illinois Historic Preservation Agency

Italianate architecture in Illinois
National Register of Historic Places in Jo Daviess County, Illinois
National Historic Landmarks in Illinois
Houses on the National Register of Historic Places in Illinois
Home
Presidential homes in the United States
Buildings and structures in Galena, Illinois
Illinois State Historic Sites
Historic house museums in Illinois
Museums in Jo Daviess County, Illinois
Presidential museums in Illinois
Historic district contributing properties in Illinois
Houses in Jo Daviess County, Illinois